These are the results for the girls event at the 2018 Summer Youth Olympics.

Results

References 

Results

Triathlon at the 2018 Summer Youth Olympics